La Vermine du Lion (The Lion's Parasites) is a  science fiction novel by French writer Francis Carsac, first published in paperback by Fleuve Noir in 1967. It was reissued by Super-luxe in 1978 and Eons in 2004. The first hardcover edition was issued after the author's death by La page blanche in December 1982 with a new preface by Jacques Tixier. To date no English translation has been published.

The novel was dedicated to Carsac's American friends and science fiction writer colleagues Poul Anderson and L. Sprague de Camp, from whose works the author acknowledged borrowing some elements.

Plot summary
The novel is an interplanetary adventure along the lines of de Camp's Krishna series. The protagonist, geologist Téraï Laprade, champions the native humanoids of the planet Eldorado against a predatory conglomerate bent on exterminating them so it can freely plunder their world's mineral wealth.

Reception
The novel was included in Annick Béguin's Les 100 principaux titres de la science-fiction in 1981.

L. Sprague de Camp called the book "a whale of a story," and with the permission of Carsac's widow undertook to translate it into English for the American market. His agent circulated a three-chapter sample with a synopsis of the remainder of the story to U.S. publishers, but it was rejected on the grounds that Carsac "had no name recognition in the US and, being dead, could not be sold as a 'coming' writer."

Notes

1967 French novels
1967 science fiction novels
French science fiction novels